NSW TrainLink is a train and coach operator in Australia, providing services throughout New South Wales and the Australian Capital Territory, along with limited interstate services into Victoria, Queensland and South Australia. Its primary intercity and regional services are spread throughout five major rail lines, operating out of Sydney's Central railway station.

NSW TrainLink was formed on 1 July 2013 when RailCorp was restructured and CountryLink was merged with the intercity services of CityRail.

History
In May 2012, the Minister for Transport announced a restructure of RailCorp. On 1 July 2013, NSW TrainLink took over (a) the operation of regional rail and coach services previously operated by CountryLink; (b) non-metropolitan Sydney services previously operated by CityRail; and (c) responsibility for the Main Northern railway line from Berowra railway station to Newcastle station, the Main Western railway line from Emu Plains railway station to Bathurst railway station, and the Illawarra railway line from Waterfall station to Bomaderry railway station.

Network
The NSW TrainLink network is divided into two tiers, branded as Intercity and Regional. Intercity services operate commuter style services, mainly to and from Sydney with limited stops within the metropolitan area. The Intercity network is part of Transport for NSW's Opal ticketing system. Seats on Intercity services are available on a first-come, first-served basis. Regional services operate in areas of lower population density, providing passenger transport mainly between regional NSW and Sydney (although some cross country and interstate services operate). Regional services use a separate, reserved seat, ticketing system.

Intercity services 

Electric services extend from Sydney north to Newcastle, west to Lithgow and south to Port Kembla and Kiama. Most electric services originate from or terminate at Central.

Diesel trains serve the more distant or less populated parts of the Intercity network. Hunter Line services operate from Newcastle to Telarah with some extending to Dungog and Scone. Southern Highlands Line services operate between Campbelltown and Moss Vale with a limited number extending to Sydney and Goulburn. Diesel services also operate on the South Coast Line between Kiama and Bomaderry. The Bathurst Bullet provides a twice daily, limited stop service between Sydney and Bathurst.

Lines

  Some peak services and most weekend services on the South Coast Line run to/from Bondi Junction
  Some peak services on the Southern Highlands Line run to/from Central. At other times, a change of train is required at Campbelltown

Intercity train fares
The Opal fare system for Intercity services is fully integrated with the Sydney Trains and Sydney Metro networks – trips involving Intercity, Sydney suburban and metro services are calculated as a single fare and there is no interchange penalty. Opal is also valid on bus, ferry, and light rail services in the Greater Sydney region (except for the Southern Highlands) but separate fares apply for these modes. The following table lists Opal fares for reusable smartcards and single trip tickets as:

^ = $2.50 for Senior/Pensioner cardholders

Bus and coach services
NSW TrainLink operates several bus routes along corridors where the railway line has been closed to passengers or as a supplement to rail services. These bus services are operated by private sector bus companies contracted by NSW TrainLink.

Wollongong to Moss Vale/Bundanoon
Moss Vale to Goulburn
Picton to Bowral via Picton–Mittagong loop line on weekdays only

  Seat reservations required

Regional services 

NSW TrainLink operates passenger services throughout New South Wales and interstate to Brisbane, Canberra and Melbourne. All rail services feature diesel rolling stock. For more details of each train line see List of NSW TrainLink train routes.

  Some peak services and most weekend services on the South Coast Line run to/from Bondi Junction
  Some peak services on the Southern Highlands Line run to/from Central. At other times, a change of train is required at Campbelltown

North Coast
The North Coast services operate through the Mid North Coast, Northern Rivers and South East Queensland regions. Services operate on the Main North and North Coast lines, travelling between Sydney Central station and Roma Street station in Brisbane.

Principal stations served by XPT trains are:
 Taree
 Kempsey
 Coffs Harbour
 Grafton
 Casino
 Brisbane

Cities and towns served by NSW TrainLink coaches connecting off North Coast services include: Tea Gardens, Forster, Port Macquarie, Yamba, Moree, Alstonville, Lismore, Ballina, Byron Bay, Murwillumbah, Tweed Heads and Surfers Paradise.

North Western
The North Western region services operate through the Hunter, New England and North West Slopes & Plains regions. Services operate on the Main North line from Sydney Central station to Werris Creek. where the service divides for Armidale and Moree.

Principal stations served by Xplorer trains are:
 Singleton
 Scone
 Tamworth
 Armidale
 Gunnedah
 Narrabri
 Moree

Cities and towns served by NSW TrainLink coaches connecting off North Western services include: Wee Waa, Inverell, Grafton, Glen Innes and Tenterfield.

Western
The Western region services operate through the Central Tablelands, Orana, and Far West regions. Services operate on the Main Western line from Sydney Central station to Dubbo and the Broken Hill line to Broken Hill.

Principal stations served by XPT trains are:
Bathurst
Orange
Dubbo

Principal stations served by Xplorer trains are:
 Bathurst
 Orange
 Parkes
 Broken Hill

Cities and towns served by NSW TrainLink coaches connecting off Western services include: Oberon, Mudgee, Baradine, Cowra, Grenfell, Forbes, Parkes, Condobolin, Lightning Ridge Brewarrina, Bourke, Warren and Broken Hill.

Southern
The Southern region services operate through the Illawarra, South Coast, Monaro, South West Slopes, Southern Tablelands, Riverina, and Sunraysia regions, plus the Australian Capital Territory and parts of Victoria. The Government of Victoria contributes financially to the provision of the interstate services. The ACT Government does not make a financial contribution.

Services operate on the:
Main South line from Sydney Central station to Albury then continue on the North East line to Southern Cross station in Melbourne
Bombala line from south of Goulburn to Queanbeyan where services join the Canberra line to terminate inside the Australian Capital Territory at Canberra
Hay line from Junee to Yanco where services join the Yanco-Griffith line to Griffith

Principal stations served by XPT trains are:
Goulburn
Cootamundra
Wagga Wagga
Albury
Wangaratta
Melbourne

Principal stations served by Xplorer trains are:
Moss Vale
Goulburn
Queanbeyan
Canberra
Cootamundra
Griffith

Cities and towns served by NSW TrainLink coaches connecting off Southern services include: Wollongong, Bombala, Eden, Tumbarumba, Bathurst, Dubbo, Condobolin, Griffith, Mildura and Echuca.

Coach services

NSW TrainLink continued with the existing contracts entered into by CityRail and CountryLink for the provision of coach services.

On 1 July 2014, the Lithgow to Gulgong, Coonabarabran, Baradine services passed from Greyhound Australia to Ogden's Coaches.

In July 2014, Transport for NSW commenced the re-tendering process for most of the routes with the previous 24 contracts reorganised into 18 contracts. The new contracts commenced on 1 January 2015 for a five-year period, with an option to extend for three years if performance criteria are met. The services operated by Forest Coach Lines and Sunstate Coaches commenced new five-year contracts on 1 July 2016.

The full list of coach operators providing services as at January 2015 was:

+ not included in January 2015 re-tendering process

Since 2018, NSW TrainLink have introduced several new road coach services on a trial basis

Brewarrina to Coolabah commenced May 2018
Bourke to Dubbo commenced May 2018
Tamworth to Port Macquarie
Tamworth to Scone, had ceased by November 2018
Tamworth to Dubbo
Campbelltown to Goulburn commenced September 2018
Goulburn to Canberra commenced September 2018
Forster to Coffs Harbour commenced April 2019
Wagga Wagga to Queanbeyan commenced April 2019
Broken Hill to Adelaide commenced June 2019
Broken Hill to Mildura commenced June 2019
Anglers Reach to Cooma commenced December 2019
Bigga to Goulburn commenced December 2019
Delegate to Nimmitabel commenced December 2019
Goodooga to Dubbo commenced December 2019
Moree to Walgett commenced December 2019

Rolling stock

The NSW TrainLink fleet consists of both diesel and electric traction, with the oldest of the fleet being the V sets and the youngest being the H sets, the latter is shared with Sydney Trains. Tangaras operate some peak hour South Coast Line services as far as Wollongong. The entire NSW TrainLink fleet is maintained by Sydney Trains either directly or via a Sydney Trains contract with UGL Rail.

Intercity services

Interstate and regional services

Future fleet 
A fleet of 610 D set carriages will be introduced to the NSW TrainLink intercity network. They will replace the V sets and allow the H sets to be transferred to Sydney Trains services. The first was delivered in December 2019.

A fleet of bi-mode CAF Civity trains are scheduled to replace the XPT, Xplorer and Endeavour fleets from 2023, as part of the NSW TrainLink Regional Train Project.

Performance
In the year ended 30 June 2018, 44.7 million journeys were made on intercity services. There were 1.7 million journeys on regional services. Patronage on intercity services increased by 9 percent over the previous financial year but fell by 1.4 percent for regional services.

Intercity services are considered on-time if they operate within six minutes of their scheduled time. For regional services the benchmark is ten minutes. The target is for 92 percent of intercity services and 78 percent of regional services to operate on-time. In 2017–18 NSW Trains met both the Intercity target and the regional target. However, it failed to meet the Intercity target during peak hours. These results partially reverse a trend of failing to meet punctuality targets. Since the organisation commenced operations in 2013–14, NSW Trains has never met the intercity peak punctuality target. Regional train services have achieved their punctuality target twice, in 2015–16 and 2017–18. The 2015-16 result was the first time NSW Trains or its predecessor RailCorp had achieved the target in 13 years.

The following table lists patronage figures for the network during the corresponding financial year. Australia's financial years start on 1 July and end on 30 June. Major events that affected the number of journeys made or how patronage is measured are included as notes.

Quiet carriages
Quiet carriages are designated carriages where noise made by passengers is requested to be kept to a minimum. Passengers are asked to place mobile phones on silent, move carriages in order to have a conversation with another passenger and use headphones when listening to music.

Quiet carriages are on Intercity services are located in four carriages on 8 car sets, two carriages on 4 car sets and one carriage on two car sets.

Quiet carriages were first introduced on the Central Coast & Newcastle Line in early 2012 as a three-month trial. On 1 September 2012 quiet carriages were permanently introduced and expanded to all intercity services operating on the Blue Mountains and South Coast lines. As of 2013, Quiet Carriages operate on the entire NSW TrainLink Intercity network.

Depots
The XPT fleet is maintained at the XPT Service Centre and the Endeavour and Xplorer fleets at Eveleigh Railway Workshops. The V sets are maintained at Flemington Maintenance Depot. The D sets will be maintained at a new facility at Kangy Angy. The new bi-mode fleet will be maintained at a new facility in Mindyarra Maintenance Centre in Dubbo.

References

External links

NSW TrainLink website

 
Australian companies established in 2013
Transport
Railway companies established in 2013
Railway companies of New South Wales